Noël Coulet (4 October 1932 – 15 January 2023) was a French academic and medieval historian.

Biography
During his doctoral studies, he was a student of Georges Duby. After his thesis titled Aix-en-Provence, espace et relations d'une capitale, mi-XIVe - mi-XVe s., he researched Provence during the 14th and 15th Centuries and particuarly focused on religious history. He was a professor emeritus of medieval history at the University of Provence.

Coulet died in Aix-en-Provence on 15 January 2023, at the age of 90.

Publications
Ten articles published in Les Cahiers de Fangeaux
"Les jeux de la Fête Dieu d'Aix, une fête médiévale ?" (1981)
Les Templiers de Bayle au xiie siècle : un document inédit" (2004)
Histoire de la Provence (with )

References

1932 births
2023 deaths
20th-century French historians
21st-century French historians
University of Provence alumni
Academic staff of the University of Provence